The Roscoe Diner, located in the hamlet of Roscoe in Sullivan County, New York is a frequent stopping point for those traveling Route 17 between New York City and Western New York. The one-story diner with flagstone exterior is just off the Roscoe/Lew Beach exit (exit 94). It is a popular spot both for students heading to and from colleges in New York State, for flyfishermen as well as locals.

Description

The Roscoe Diner was built in 1962 or 1964 and is considered to be one of the busiest and most well known restaurants along Route 17. Although Roscoe is a small town with a population of less than 600 at the time of the 2000 census, the diner served anywhere between several hundred and a thousand meals each day at its peak, leading the diner to declare itself "World Famous."

Customer numbers have declined in recent years due to a decline in trout fishing, the region's main draw. 2006 floods in the region came close but did not damage the diner.

The diner's signature item is its French Toast, featuring slabs of bread that are 1.5" thick. Breakfast is served all day, and meals are served on Syracuse China. Pennants from colleges in New York and across the northeast region decorate the walls.

References

Restaurants in New York (state)
Catskills
Diners in New York (state)
Buildings and structures in Sullivan County, New York
Tourist attractions in Sullivan County, New York
Restaurants established in 1964
Commercial buildings completed in 1964
1960s establishments in New York (state)